Paavam Krooran is a 1984 Indian Malayalam-language film, directed by Rajasenan and produced by V. Rajan. The film stars Shankar, Bhagyalakshmi (actress), Madhuri, T. G. Ravi and Captain Raju. The film has musical score by A. T. Ummer.

Cast

Shankar as Sub Inspector Madhusoodanan
Bhagyalakshmi
Madhuri
T. G. Ravi as Damodaran/Damu
Hari as Sub Inspector Xavier
Captain Raju
Kalaranjini as Sheela
Sathaar as Sub Inspector Shaji
Devan
Jagannatha Varma
K. P. Ummer as Menon
Mala Aravindan as Madhulan
Nanditha Bose

Soundtrack
The music was composed by A. T. Ummer with lyrics by Poovachal Khader.

References

External links
 

1984 films
1980s Malayalam-language films
Films directed by Rajasenan
Films scored by A. T. Ummer